The University of Nottingham Ningbo China (UNNC) is a higher educational institution located in Ningbo, Zhejiang, China, which offers University of Nottingham degrees to its students. Established as a separate legal entity, it is jointly owned by the Zhejiang-based Wanli Education Group and the UK-based University of Nottingham. With around 7,000 students, the university offers a range of undergraduate and postgraduate programs primarily in arts and humanities, social sciences, science, and engineering. The curriculum is taught in English and follows a British-style education system.

History 
In 2004, Dr. Chen Zhili, Councillor of the State Council of the People's Republic of China and former Education Minister, launched the China Policy Institute, a think-tank which produces research and policy papers to help build a more informed dialogue between China and the UK and to guide government and business strategies.

Professor Lu Yongxiang, president of the Chinese Academy of Sciences, came to Nottingham where he was awarded an honorary degree and gave a keynote speech to a university conference on traditional Chinese medicine. Dr. Chen, Councillor of the State Council of the People's Republic of China and former Education Minister, received her honorary degree of Doctor of Laws from the University of Nottingham in 2003. Professor Yang Fujia has been appointed sixth Chancellor of the university.

The university admitted its first students in 2004 for Arts and Social Science subjects. The 146 acre (591,333m²) campus was launched on 6 September 2005 by British Prime Minister Tony Blair from Beijing in a broadcast for China Central Television. It was officially opened on 23 February 2006 by British Deputy Prime Minister John Prescott, in the presence of Chinese education minister Zhou Ji and State Counsellor Chen Zhili.

The president of the university is Professor Yang Fujia, an academician of the Chinese Academy of Sciences and former president of Fudan University.

At the end of 2012, the British Quality Assurance Agency for Higher Education (QAA) went to the University of Nottingham Ningbo China for a quality assessment. In May 2013, QAA officially released the Quality Assessment report on the university and concluded that the academic level of University of Nottingham Ningbo China and the quality of students were consistent with the University of Nottingham in the United Kingdom.

On 9 June 2018, Michele Geraci, an Assistant Professor of Finance at the University of Nottingham Ningbo China (UNNC) was appointed to a top position in the Italian government. At a ceremony in Rome, Michele Geraci was sworn in by Italian Prime Minister Giuseppe Conte as Under-Secretary for Economic Development in the newly formed government, a rank below ministry.

In 2018, Stephen Morgan, who served as Nottingham Ningbo's associate provost since 2016, was removed from its management board for criticizing the 19th National Congress of the Communist Party of China and being a critic of broader party-backed initiatives in the university, but remained on the faculty.

Campus
The university is located within Ningbo Higher Education Park, situated on the outskirts of Ningbo under the jurisdiction of Yinzhou District. The campus spans 900 mu (60 hectares or 150 acres) and features Chinese and English gardens, lakes, a sports centre, student residences, a library, academic and administration buildings, staff accommodation, and a high street with various shops, restaurants, and coffee outlets, including what is alleged to be the first Starbucks branch on a mainland China campus.

In September 2008, the university opened the Centre for Sustainable Energy Technologies (CSET), which houses China's first zero-carbon building and provides laboratory facilities, offices, and seminar accommodations. The university expanded its facilities in 2011 with the construction of the new Science and Engineering Building, which includes laboratories, auditoriums, and offices for researchers and lecturers.

The GB6M Ningbo New Materials Institute was launched in 2015 within the city's HiTech Zone, focusing on the development of new solutions for energy conversion, soil mechanics, and composite materials. In 2016, the Lord Dearing Building was opened, featuring tiered lecture halls and small group teaching spaces. The same year, the British Ambassador to China Barbara Woodward inaugurated the DH Lawrence Auditorium, a 996-seat venue, and a second International Conference Centre was added.

Further expansion of research facilities occurred in 2017 with the opening of the 13,000m2 Sir David and Lady Susan Greenaway building, which houses various facilities, including the International Academy for Marine Economy and Technology and the first business incubator at the University of Nottingham Ningbo China.

Structure

Academic leaders
The university is led by Professor Fujia Yang, former Chancellor of The University of Nottingham, Professor Shearer West , Vice-Chancellor of The University of Nottingham and Professor Nick Miles, Provost of The University of Nottingham Ningbo China and Pro-Vice Chancellor of The University of Nottingham UK. Nick Miles succeeded the previous Provost, Professor Chris Rudd OBE in February 2019. Rudd was recognised in the Queen's 2018 New Year Honours list where he was appointed an OBE for his work in higher education and UK-China relations.  The chair of the UNNC board is Xu Yafen.

Academic departments
The university is divided into three faculties:

Faculty of Science and Engineering (FoSE)
Within the Faculty of Science and Engineering are:
 School of Aerospace
 Department of Architecture and Built Environment
 Department of Chemical and Environmental Engineering
 Department of Chemistry
 Department of Civil Engineering
 Department of Electrical and Electronic Engineering
 School of Geographical Sciences.
 Department of Mechanical, Materials and Manufacturing Engineering
 School of Mathematical Sciences
 School of Computer Science

Faculty of Humanities and Social Sciences (FHSS)
The Faculty of Humanities and Social Sciences includes 5 Schools and a language department:
 School of International Studies
 School of Economics
 School of Education
 School of English
 School of International Communications
 Language Centre

Faculty of Business (FOB)
The FOB has one school:
 Nottingham University Business School China (NUBS China)

Outside of the faculty structure the Graduate School supports postgraduate students and early career researchers.

To support the academic output of the university, administrative departments are managed centrally overseen ultimately by the provost.

Teaching

All undergraduate and postgraduate programmes in the China campus are conducted entirely in English with the same teaching and evaluation standards as at Nottingham UK by staff either seconded from Nottingham UK or appointed internationally to the University of Nottingham standards. Consistent with the UK campus, University of Nottingham Ningbo China shares the network and teaching resources from University of Nottingham UK, as well as its teaching model: small-classroom teaching, cooperative learning, cultivating students' ability of independent study, research and teamwork, content analysis and re-expression, and improving the ability of knowledge transformation.

Visual technologies, including interactive whiteboards, simulations and video conferencing are widely used to support and enhance student learning. University of Nottingham Ningbo China also makes use of visual technology to set up direct links with their UK and Malaysia Campuses, and video conferencing to enable joint projects involving students from around the world.

Activities

Programmes

UNNC offers undergraduate degrees, masters programmes and PhD study. It recruits domestic Chinese students via Gaokao into 4-year undergraduate courses and international direct entry students from more than 50 countries. International students make up around 10% of the student population. UK students are the largest international grouping but there are also significant numbers from Indonesia, Taiwan, Hong Kong, South Korea, Mauritius and East European countries. Programmes are taught entirely in English and the entry standards and degree awards are identical to those in Nottingham UK. The entry standards to UNNC are relatively high - 2016/17 Gaokao entry score were on average 40 and 60 points above division 1 for the arts and science gaokao respectively. 2017 entry saw a further rise to 48 points above division 1 (Arts) and 73 points above (Science). Small group teaching is a particular feature of UNNC's delivery and this reflects strongly in annual teaching evaluations which. year on year, are consistently higher than its sister campuses.

Partnerships and Agreements

As well as establishing bilateral links with some 60 Chinese universities, The University of Nottingham has student exchange agreements and joint research projects with most of China's top universities. This includes institutions within the Universitas 21 alliance of leading international universities, such as Fudan and Shanghai Jiao Tong.

The University of Nottingham signed a memorandum of understanding with Fudan University to create a 'Confucius Institute' in Nottingham in 2007. It is dedicated to the expansion of existing links with schools, business, government, community groups and the Chinese cultural community to promote the teaching of Chinese language and contemporary Chinese culture. The Confucius Institute will also promote academic links with Chinese universities and showcase contemporary Chinese popular art and media, including films, television programmes and the creative arts such as painting, photography, literature, music and the performing arts. In April 2016 the Nottingham-Fudan Confucius Institute opened a branch at UNNC. This is the first such CI to establish a presence in mainland China. The opening was attended by President Yang, Professor Sir David Greenaway and Hanban Director Madam Xu Lin.

The University of Nottingham has teaching and research links with China in fields such as satellite technology, the environment, education and law.  Nottingham has experienced an increase in its research activity with Chinese universities and has seen a huge increase in the number of Chinese students wishing to study in the UK. In addition to the Chinese students coming to Nottingham, more than 1,400 students from the UK and around the world are taking courses about on China.

Around 250 undergraduate students each year transfer to Nottingham UK on 2+2 programs where they complete their studies. UNNC students perform especially strongly in STEM subjects and their degree results are generally higher than UK counterparts. More than 70% of UNNC graduates progress to further studies overseas, the majority to World top 50 Universities. 2016 saw 2 students progressing to MIT, 4 to Cambridge, 11 to Oxford, 58 to Imperial and 128 to UCL.

Student Activities

Student societies, organisations and activities in the University of Nottingham Ningbo China are supported by the Student Engagement Office (SEO). SEO sets out to enhance students' living experience through a variety of programs, activities and services. It is a direct response to students' expectations of proactive engagement both on campus and in local communities. It aims to cultivate a transparent, diverse and competitive environment, particularly with regards to extracurricular activities where students achieve success through their cumulated knowledge, teamwork and leadership skills.

The University of Nottingham Ningbo China has various organizations and societies, including 20 service-oriented student organizations, many student innovation teams, and more than 70 societies in four major categories including academic, practical, liberal arts and sports. The student organizations and societies are committed to conducting a variety of extra-curricular activities, strengthening the communication between the university and local community, and sharing global education experience and achievements, promoting the integration of domestic and international students, and enhancing the communication between teachers and students.

Sport

Each year, the Tri Campus Games brings together students from the three University of Nottingham campuses (UK, China and Malaysia) to compete against each other in a week-long festival of sport. The event involves nearly 200 students from over 20 different nationalities. The games are a unique event within higher education, taking place at a different one of the university's international campuses each year. Underpinned by the ethos 'friendship through sport', the Games offer a fantastic opportunity for sporting and educational exchange in the friendly spirit of competition.

Research and innovation
The University of Nottingham Ningbo China is active in research and collaborates with China as well as internationally, particularly with The University of Nottingham UK. It aims at bringing the research expertise of The University of Nottingham UK to China. In 2017, the UNNC's PhD license, which was granted in 2007, was updated to allow the university to recruit 225 PhD students each year. The university's internationalized research is reflected in its bibliometrics indicators. Nottingham China's Field Weighted Citation Index for 2012-16 was ahead of prestigious Chinese institutions at 1.45 (Scival) and in several disciplines (Business, Economics, Engineering, Humanities, Social Sciences) leads the home institution.

Currently, University of Nottingham Ningbo China's research institutes are:
Centre for Sustainable Energy Technologies (CSET)
Centre for Global Finance
Centre for Research in Applied Linguistics
Centre for Research on Globalisation and Economic Policy
Institute for Comparative Cultural Studies
Institute of Asia Pacific Studies (IAPS)
International Centre for Behavioural Business Research
International Finance Research Centre
Learning Science Research Centre
Nottingham Ningbo New Materials Institute
International Academy for the Marine Economy and Technology

Cultural links
The university has a scholarship programme with Hunan University and a joint appointment with the famous Tsinghua University in Beijing, focusing on international collaboration. It is working on e-learning initiatives with Chinese institutions.

The University of Nottingham's former Vice-Chancellor, Professor Sir Colin Campbell, was awarded Honorary Citizenship of the city of Ningbo and received an Honorary Doctorate from Shanghai Jiao Tong University. Honorary citizenships have also been bestowed upon Sir David Greenaway and former PVC Hai-Sui Yu. Economic development agencies within the United Kingdom are now based at the campus of The University of Nottingham Ningbo China. The City of Nottingham is twinned with the City of Ningbo, and there are well established cultural and community projects in both England and China. Welbeck Primary School in Nottingham has a link with Jiangdong Central Primary school in Ningbo, China, along with five other Nottingham schools. Students from Ningbo visiting the UK for study now undertake volunteering work within local schools helping to widen appreciation of Chinese culture and lifestyle.

The University of Nottingham Ningbo China also develops relationships with partners globally in terms of world changing research, innovative teaching collaboration, international capacity building projects and exciting international projects. In 2017, it assisted the UK campus for the International Partnership Forum which generated fruitful results, since then, this has become an annual event which the university is expanding internationally. The university now works with around 109 University partners in countries around the world.

See also
University of Nottingham Malaysia Campus

References

External links
 University of Nottingham Ningbo China website
 Nottingham University Business School (NUBS), China website

Educational institutions established in 2004
Universities and colleges in Zhejiang
Ningbo
Satellite campuses
2004 establishments in China